The 2021 season is Flora's 31st season as a professional football club, all coming in the Meistriliiga, the highest division of the Estonian Football Association annual football championship. In addition to the domestic league, the club will also compete in both the 2020–21 and 2021–22 editions of the Estonian Cup, the Estonian Supercup, the UEFA Champions League, the UEFA Europa League, and the inaugural edition of the UEFA Europa Conference League.

Players

Transfers

In

Out

Competitions

Overall record

Meistriliiga

League table

Results summary

Matches

Estonian Cup

2020–21
The tournament continued from the 2020 season.

2021–22
The tournament will continue into the 2022 season.

Estonian Supercup

UEFA Champions League

First qualifying round

Second qualifying round

UEFA Europa League

Third qualifying round

UEFA Europa Conference League

Play-off round

Group stage

The draw for the group stage was held on 27 August 2021.

Statistics

Goalscorers

Last updated: 26 August 2021

Clean sheets

Last updated: 21 July 2021

References

Estonian football clubs 2021 season
FC Flora seasons
Flora
2021–22 UEFA Europa League participants seasons
2021–22 UEFA Europa Conference League participants seasons